Streptomyces abyssalis is a bacterium species from the genus Streptomyces which has been isolated from deep sea sediments in the South China Sea on the Xisha Islands in China.

See also 
 List of Streptomyces species

References

Further reading

External links
Type strain of Streptomyces abyssalis at BacDive -  the Bacterial Diversity Metadatabase

abyssalis
Bacteria described in 2012